Clarification, clarifications, or clarify may refer to:

 Clarification (journalism)
 Clarification (cooking), purification of broths
 Clarification, preparation of clarified butter
 Clarification and stabilization of wine
 Clarification (water treatment)
 "Clarifications" (The Wire), The Wire episode
 The Clarification, Clarification concerning status of Catholics becoming Freemasons